Musik war ihr Hobby (Music was their hobby; in a reference to the German title of Murder, she wrote [Mord ist ihr Hobby - Murder is her hobby]), subtitled Die frühen Singles (The early singles) is a single box by the German punk band Die Toten Hosen. It contains the early singles from 1982-1984.

Track listing

Wir sind bereit (1982)
 "Wir sind bereit" (We are ready) (Frege, von Holst/Frege) − 2:01
 "Jürgen Englers Party" (Frege, von Holst/Frege) − 1:26

Reisefieber (1982)
 "Reisefieber" (Travel nerves, lit. Travel fever) (Breitkopf, Frege, von Holst, Meurer, Trimpop/Frege) − 3:46
 "Niemandsland" (No man's land) (Frege, von Holst/Frege) − 2:41

Armee der Verlierer (1983)
 "Armee der Verlierer" (Army of losers) (Frege, von Holst/Frege) − 4:23
 "Eisgekühlter Bommerlunder" (Ice-cold Bommerlunder) (Molinare, Dt.Spez.; Trimpop/Trimpop) − 2:58
 "Opel-Gang" (von Holst, Frege/Breitkopf, Frege, von Holst, Meurer, Trimpop) − 1:59

Hip Hop Bommi Bop (1983)
 "Hip Hop Bommi Bop" (Breitkopf, Frege, v. Holst, Meurer, Trimpop/Meurer, Trimpop) − 4:25
 "Hip Hop Bommi Bop Bop" − 6:47 (with Fab Five Freddy)

Schöne Bescherung (1983)
 "Schöne Bescherung" (roughly Happy holidays; lit. Nice gift-giving, also Nice mess) (Breitkopf, Frege, von Holst, Meurer, Trimpop/Frege) − 3:02
 "Willi's weiße Weihnacht" (Willi's white christmas) (Breitkopf, Frege, von Holst, Meurer, Trimpop/Frege) − 2:35
 "Knecht Ruprechts letzte Fahrt" (Knecht Ruprecht's last ride) (Breitkopf, Frege, von Holst, Meurer, Trimpop/Frege) − 3:46

Kriminaltango (1984)
 "Kriminaltango" (Criminal tango) (Trombetto/Feltz) − 3:32
 "Allein vor deinem Haus" (Alone in front of your house) (von Holst, Frege/Frege, Meurer, Trimpop) − 2:26
 "Es ist vorbei...." (It's over) (Frege, von Holst/Frege, Meurer, Trimpop) − 3:09

Liebesspieler (1984)
 "Liebesspieler" (Love player) (von Holst, Breitkopf, Frege/Frege) − 2:50
 Die John Peel Session:
 "Spiel mir das Lied vom Tod" (Play me the song of death; German title for Once Upon a Time in the West) (Ennio Morricone) − 1:14
 "Es ist vorbei" − 2:27
 "Till to the Bitter End" (Frege/Frege) − 2:48 (English version of "Bis zum bitteren Ende")
 "Seafever" (Breitkopf, Frege, von Holst, Meurer, Trimpop/Frege) − 3:38 (English version of "Reisefieber")
 "Hofgarten" (Court garden) (Breitkopf, von Holst, Meurer/von Holst) − 1:41

Personnel
Campino - vocals
Andreas von Holst - guitar
Michael Breitkopf - guitar
Andreas Meurer - bass
Trini Trimpop - drums

1995 compilation albums
Die Toten Hosen compilation albums